Lalam  is a village in Kottayam district in the state of Kerala, India.

Demographics
 India census, Lalam had a population of 8571 with 4306 males and 4265 females.

References

Villages in Kottayam district